The Istra High Voltage Research Center (HVRC), also dubbed the Tesla Generators Research Facility, was a Soviet-operated testing facility built in the 1970s outside the town of Istra, 40 kilometers west of Moscow, and operated by the Moscow Power Engineering Institute.

Description 
The facility is notable for containing what is believed to be the world's largest Marx generator, which was originally created to help test lightning insulation in military aircraft. The facility has several huge Tesla coils on the facility grounds, some of which range over 20 stories in height. Combined these create what the Soviets nicknamed a "lightning machine."

In all the facility contains a 3 megawatt capacity transformer cascade, a 9 megawatt Pulsed Voltage Generator (PVG), measuring 39.3 meters high and capable of creating 150-meter artificial lightning, and a 2.25 megawatt constant voltage unit.

History 

Originally built sometime in the 1970s, the facility was at first used for a mix of military and scientific testing being maintained by the Moscow Power Engineering Institute.

At one point the facility housed a large ovoidal dome named Allure. The building was used as an electromagnetic pulse (EMP) weapons testing facility and stationary simulator before it was demolished in January 1985, after the building's roof collapsed due to the weight of excessive snowfall. This resulted in the construction supervisor on the dome project being terminated from his job and replaced with Communist Party member Boris Yeltsin, who later would serve as the first President of the Russian Federation.

After the fall of the Soviet Union the facility became mostly inactive, only being used on occasion for private-sector testing, including testing of the lightning strike resistance of the Sukhoi Superjet 100 in 2011.

The Marx generator is rarely turned on today, with the last recorded use being in August 2014.

See also 

 Bely Rast High Voltage Research Station
 ATLAS-I

References 

Science and technology in Russia
Research institutes in the Soviet Union
Electronic test equipment
Energy research institutes